Pavenar (also Romanized as Pāvenār) is a village in Howmeh-ye Sarpol Rural District, in the Central District of Sarpol-e Zahab County, Kermanshah Province, Iran. At the 2006 census, its population was 446, in 102 families.

Pavenar is a village situated in the western region of Iran, specifically in the Qada' Bayji area of Ostan-e Kermanshah. It is located 83 kilometers to the west of Ostan-e Kermanshah. One of the notable attractions in Pavenar is the sculpture "Man in a Case". While there are not many tourist attractions in Pavenar itself, there are several popular destinations in the surrounding areas. Pavenar has been included in the list of TOP-100 tourist attractions in Iran.

References 

Populated places in Sarpol-e Zahab County